Niotaze is a city in Chautauqua County, Kansas, United States.  As of the 2020 census, the population of the city was 90.

History
Niotaze probably derived its name from Niota, Illinois or Niota, Tennessee.

Circa 1910, Niotaze had a population of 317. At that time it was an important shipping point for grain, livestock and produce at the junction of two railroads.

Geography
Niotaze is located at  (37.066311, -96.015501).

Demographics

2010 census
As of the census of 2010, there were 82 people, 33 households, and 22 families residing in the city. The racial makeup of the city was 85.4% White, 7.3% Native American, and 7.3% from two or more races.

There were 33 households, of which 33.3% had children under the age of 18 living with them, 54.5% were married couples living together, 6.1% had a female householder with no husband present, 6.1% had a male householder with no wife present, and 33.3% were non-families. 33.3% of all households were made up of individuals, and 18.2% had someone living alone who was 65 years of age or older. The average household size was 2.48 and the average family size was 3.09.

The median age in the city was 42 years. 25.6% of residents were under the age of 18; 2.4% were between the ages of 18 and 24; 24.4% were from 25 to 44; 25.7% were from 45 to 64; and 22% were 65 years of age or older. The gender makeup of the city was 57.3% male and 42.7% female.

2000 census
As of the census of 2000, there were 122 people, 47 households, and 32 families residing in the city. The racial makeup of the city was 90.16% White, 5.74% Native American, and 4.10% from two or more races. Hispanic or Latino of any race were 6.56% of the population.

There were 47 households, out of which 34.0% had children under the age of 18 living with them, 57.4% were married couples living together, 6.4% had a female householder with no husband present, and 29.8% were non-families. 29.8% of all households were made up of individuals, and 12.8% had someone living alone who was 65 years of age or older. The average household size was 2.60 and the average family size was 3.24.

In the city, the population was spread out, with 30.3% under the age of 18, 6.6% from 18 to 24, 27.0% from 25 to 44, 21.3% from 45 to 64, and 14.8% who were 65 years of age or older. The median age was 36 years. For every 100 females, there were 139.2 males. For every 100 females age 18 and over, there were 112.5 males.

The median income for a household in the city was $27,500, and the median income for a family was $27,679. Males had a median income of $17,500 versus $9,583 for females. The per capita income for the city was $9,738. There were 21.6% of families and 29.0% of the population living below the poverty line, including 45.8% of under eighteens and 35.3% of those over 64.

Education
The community is served by Caney Valley USD 436 public school district.

Infrastructure

Transportation
U.S. Route 166 highway currently runs east–west through the community.

Rail
Previously two railroads, Santa Fe and Missouri Pacific, went through the community, but both lines have been abandoned.

References

Further reading

External links

 Niotaze - Directory of Public Officials
 Niotaze city map, KDOT

Cities in Kansas
Cities in Chautauqua County, Kansas